The Martin W. Richard Charitable Foundation is a 501(c)(3) tax-exempt charitable foundation established by the parents of Martin Richard (June 9, 2004 – April 15, 2013), an 8-year-old boy who was killed in the Boston Marathon bombing on April 15, 2013. The foundation is dedicated to promoting education and sports in the community.

Since 2014, the foundation has raised money through its  charity team at the annual Boston Marathon. Team MR8, named after Martin Richard's initials and his favorite sports number, is composed of volunteer runners, including runners who may not usually qualify to run in the race due to their time scores. The team members raise money for the foundation, which in turn invests in projects such as the Challenger Sports program at the Boys and Girls Club of Dorchester, the Martin Richard Park Project, and community clean-ups. Donations to the Challenger Sports club help finance athletics programs for children with disabilities.

During 2016's "One Boston Day," held annually on April 15, the foundation sponsored a community clean-up of Dorchester's Peabody Square and Dorchester Avenue. Team MR8 raised $1.25 million during the 2014 Boston Marathon Race and raised over $2 million as of March 2016.

Martin's Park, which opened in 2019, is located in the Seaport District adjacent to the Boston Children's Museum. Construction began in June 2017, following a $13 million investment from the Martin Richard Foundation. The park overlooks Fort Point Channel and features a children's playground, a performance space, and an upgraded Harborwalk, as well as a garden and water park.

References 

Sports foundations based in the United States
Non-profit organizations based in Massachusetts